The India national cricket team toured the West Indies during the 1988–89 cricket season. India played four Test matches and five One Day International matches between 2 March and 3 May 1989, against the West Indian cricket team, with the West Indies winning the Test series 3–0 and ODI series 5–0.

Background 
The Indian squad for left for the West Indies on 26 February 1989. The side entered Caribbean on the back of a decent record barring the 1961–62 tour when they lost the series 5–0. In the 24 Tests played until then, India had won 2, lost 10 and drawn 12.

First-class matches

Four-day: West Indies Board President's XI v Indians

Three-day: West Indies Under-23s v Indians 

The India team entered the game on the back of a 3–0 ODI series loss against the West Indies senior team, which ended on 11 March. Players who featured in the said matches and the first-class match against West Indies Board President's XI — Dilip Vengsarkar, Kapil Dev, Mohammad Azharuddin, Kiran More — and two others, Ravi Shastri and Chetan Sharma, were rested. The side was captained by Krishnamachari Srikkanth. The West Indies Under-23s included Kenny Benjamin, who played for the senior team. Carl Hooper, another regular in both teams, was rested for the game. The Under-23s side was captained by Brian Lara, then 19. Batting first after winning the toss, the Indians declared after making 411/6. Navjot Singh Sidhu and Sanjay Manjrekar put on 171 runs for the third wicket with both scoring centuries. The West Indies Under-23s were all out at 405, with Lara top-scoring for the side with 182, coming off 237 balls. His century came in 177 balls and included 12 fours. For the Indians, Narendra Hirwani (5/150) returned with best figures.

Four-day: West Indies Board XI v Indians

Four-day: Jamaica v Indians

Test matches

1st Test

2nd Test

3rd Test

4th Test

ODIs

The West Indies won the Cable and Wireless ODI Series 5–0.

1st ODI

2nd ODI

3rd ODI

4th ODI

5th ODI

References

External links
 Cricarchive
 Tour page CricInfo
 Record CricInfo

1989 in Indian cricket
1989 in West Indian cricket
Indian cricket tours of the West Indies
International cricket competitions from 1988–89 to 1991
West Indian cricket seasons from 1970–71 to 1999–2000